Giannis Kiliaras (born 9 June 1988) is a Greek professional footballer who plays as a left back for Super League 2 club Irodotos.

Club career
Born in Nea Alikarnassos, Kiliaras began playing football for local Cretan side Irodotos, with whom he made his senior debut in the Delta Ethniki, before making a leap in his career and signing with Super League side Ergotelis. Following a one-year loan to fellow Cretan Delta Ethniki side PANOM, Kiliaras signed his first professional contract with the club in the summer of 2007. After a brief loan spell to Gamma Ethniki side Trikala in the winter of 2010, Kiliaras left Ergotelis in the summer of 2010 having made a total of 11 appearances and having scored 1 goal. In August, he signed a contract with Patras-based club Panachaiki. with whom he played in both the Third and Second Division.

He returned to Ergotelis and the Super League in 2013, but left in September 2014, after a falling out with the club's board of directors following a loan deal refusal. After releasing himself from his contract, Kiliaras rejoined his childhood club Irodotos in the Gamma Ethniki. After one season with Irodotos, Kiliaras signed with Cretan former renowned club OFI, who had been relegated to the Gamma Ethniki following its withdrawal from professional competitions. In the years following, Kiliaras was named among the team's captains, won promotion to the Football League and eventually helped reclaim the team's spot in the Super League, winning the Second Division title in 2018. Being one of the last players in OFI's Super League roster still remaining from the club's years in the third Division, Kiliaras received substantially less playing time in top-flight, and was eventually released from his contract in the winter of 2019. Having been in talks with Ergotelis' new administration, Kiliaras rejoined the club on the same day after his release from OFI, thus starting his third tenure with the Cretan club.

Personal life
Born in Heraklion, Kiliaras began playing football at a young age, when his father, a retired Irodotos footballer, signed him up at the infrastructure segments of his former club. His older brother Dimitris is also a professional footballer. They played together for Ergotelis in the Superleague during the 2007–08 season.

Honours

Panachaiki 
Football League 2: 2010–11

OFI 
Gamma Ethniki: 2015–16
Football League: 2017–18

References

External links
 
Myplayer.gr Profile
Profile at epae.org
Guardian Football
Profile at Onsports.gr

1988 births
Living people
Greek footballers
Football League (Greece) players
Ergotelis F.C. players
Trikala F.C. players
Panachaiki F.C. players
OFI Crete F.C. players
People from Heraklion (regional unit)
Association football fullbacks
Footballers from Crete